Federal Route 92, also known as Pengerang Highway (Jalan Raya Pengerang), is a federal highway that runs from Kota Tinggi to Sungai Rengit in Johor, Malaysia. The 66.8 km (41.5 mi) highway is also a main route to Desaru beach. Federal Route 92 became the backbone of the road system linking the southeastern Johor before being surpassed by the Senai–Desaru Expressway E22.

Route background
The Kilometre Zero of the Federal Route 92 is located at Sungai Rengit near Pengerang.

History
Federal Route 92 was built under KEJORA (Southeast Johor Development Authority; or Lembaga Kemajuan Johor Tenggara in Malay) program to develop the poorly developed areas in southeastern Johor. It was constructed in the 1970s. By the 2000s, the highway was bogged down with severe congestion, and the Senai–Desaru Expressway was built to replace it.

Features
 Road with 132kv of Tenaga Nasional Berhad, TNB's transmission line (Grid Nasional).
 Roads along oil palm mill and FELDA settlements.
 Traffic signs are both Malay and English.

At most sections, the Federal Route 92 was built under the JKR R5 road standard, allowing maximum speed limit of up to 90 km/h.

List of junctions

References

Highways in Malaysia
092